Pomposa may refer to:
 Pomposa Abbey
 Lido di Pomposa, an Italian seaside resort in the province of Ferrara
 Pomposa (phasmid), stick insect genus of the subfamily Necrosciinae